Arizona Strikers FC was a women's soccer team based in Yuma, Arizona. They played in the Western Conference of the W-League, the second highest tier of women's soccer in the United States and Canada.

History
The team began as the Sedona FC Strikers, based in Sedona, Arizona.  The team moved to Yuma, Arizona and became Arizona Strikers FC on January 3, 2015.

Controversy
The team chose to sponsor The Desert Sun Clasico for July 14, 2015. It would have featured Club Tijuana against Monarcas Morelia. However, poor ticket sales lead to the events cancellation. President Manny Arias remarked that "Yuma has a lot of selfish people". That statement ignited the community as few knew of the match due to poor promotion and it is noted the team spent more time in San Luis going unnoticed by much of Yuma.  Following the comments their website was taken down and the teams Facebook page was not being updated. A second season in Yuma was now a definite no.

Year-by-year

Players

Final roster
As of July 11, 2015

Stadia
 Sedona Red Rock High School, Sedona, Arizona (2014)
 Desert Sun Stadium, Yuma, Arizona (2015)

References

Soccer clubs in Arizona
Women's soccer clubs in the United States
USL W-League (1995–2015) teams
2013 establishments in Arizona
2015 disestablishments in Arizona
Association football clubs established in 2013
Association football clubs disestablished in 2015
Yuma, Arizona
Sedona, Arizona
Women's sports in Arizona